Zamani Mbatha (born 7 April 1998) is a South African actor. He is best known for his character in the Mzansi Magic Isithembiso  telenovela as Zamani. He was portraying the role of Pule Ndlovu on e.tv  musical drama series Rhythm City.  As of 2022, Zamani resides in Sandton, Johannesburg, Gauteng.

Early life
Mbatha was born in the township of KwaMashu north-west of Durban. He is the younger brother of actress and TV personality Nomzamo Mbatha. He's an alumnus of Bechet High School and Holy Family College.

Career
Mbatha made his first debut screen  appearance in 2017 on Isithembiso telenovela aired on Mzansi Magic.

He's inspired by his sister Nomzamo Mbatha.

Filmography

Awards and  Nominations
He has been nominated in the category of “Rising Star” in the 2017 DSTV Mzansi Viewers' Choice Awards.

References

External links

21st-century South African male actors
South African male television actors
Male telenovela actors
Actors from Durban
1998 births
Living people